Mark Jonathan Briggs (born 16 February 1982) is an English football coach and former player who is currently the head coach of Sacramento Republic in the USL Championship.

Playing career

England and Denmark
Briggs began his career with West Bromwich Albion, joining them on leaving Sedgley's Dormston School in the summer of 1995. Briggs captained the youth team to a cup win at Wembley Stadium in 1999 and was Youth Team Player of the Year the same season. In 1999 he also signed his first professional contract. He made his first team debut in the 2000–01 season. After making 12 first team and 150 reserve team appearances for the Baggies, he moved to Danish football for two seasons with Herfølge in 2002, where they were the Danish 1st Division Champions and won promotion to Supa Liga.

Briggs then proceeded to bounce around the English and Welsh lower leagues, playing briefly for a multitude of clubs including Notts County FC, Shrewsbury Town FC, Hednesford Town FC. He then crossed the pond and played for Kalamazoo Outrage before returning for a second stint at Hednesford Town FC. Briggs then went back to America and spent the 2009 season with the Wilmington Hammerheads before signing with Mosta FC in Malta, where he was Player of the Year in 2009, 2010 and 2011. Briggs then returned to Wilmington where he finished his career and transitioned into coaching with the Wilmington Hammerheads.

United States and Malta
In May 2008 Briggs was convinced to cross the Atlantic by former New Zealand international Stu Riddle to play for Kalamazoo Outrage in the USL Premier Development League as an over-age player. He played the PDL season in Kalamazoo, helping the team reach the PDL playoffs.

After a brief stint back in England with Hednesford in the US offseason, Briggs signed with the Wilmington Hammerheads in the USL Second Division in 2009. The Hammerheads won the USL 2 title and Briggs was the team's Player of the Year.

Following the end of the American season, Briggs signed for Mosta of the Maltese First Division on a two-year contract on 1 October 2009.

On 25 February 2010, Charleston Battery announced the signing of Briggs on loan then for remaining season.

A spell with Tooting & Mitcham United, whom he joined for the 2011–12 season, was followed in December 2011 by a move to Rushall Olympic.

In February 2012, he rejoined Wilmington Hammerheads for a second spell in the USL Pro Division. After the 2012 season, Briggs was named the Hammerheads Player of the Year.

Managerial career
In November 2016, Briggs joined Mike Petke's staff at Real Monarchs as an assistant. Upon Petke's promotion to the Real Salt Lake senior team in March 2017, Briggs was elevated to head coach for Real Monarchs. On 20 November 2017, Briggs was named USL coach of the year after leading the Monarchs to the playoffs for the first time in their history.

In 2019, Briggs joined USL Championship club Sacramento Republic FC as Academy Director. Briggs was promoted to head coach for the 2020 season. On 7 December 2021, the Republic announced that Briggs had agreed to a new contract to bring him back for the 2022 season. On 13 July 2022, Briggs was named USL Championship coach of the month for June 2022 after leading the club to victory in all four of their league games and reaching the semifinals of the 2022 U.S. Open Cup for the first time.

Honours

As player
Wilmington Hammerheads
 USL Second Division Regular Season: 2009

As manager
Real Monarchs SLC
 USL Championship Regular Season: 2017

Individual
 USL Championship Coach of the Year: 2017

References

External links
 Mark Briggs' personal site
 Charleston Battery bio
 Wilmington Hammerheads bio
 Hednesford Town profile with career stats

1982 births
Living people
English footballers
USL Second Division players
West Bromwich Albion F.C. players
Herfølge Boldklub players
Notts County F.C. players
Tipton Town F.C. players
AFC Telford United players
Shrewsbury Town F.C. players
Northwich Victoria F.C. players
Redditch United F.C. players
The New Saints F.C. players
Welshpool Town F.C. players
Hednesford Town F.C. players
Willenhall Town F.C. players
Chasetown F.C. players
Kalamazoo Outrage players
Wilmington Hammerheads FC players
Mosta F.C. players
Charleston Battery players
USL League Two players
Northern Premier League players
Expatriate footballers in Malta
Expatriate soccer players in the United States
Expatriate men's footballers in Denmark
Tooting & Mitcham United F.C. players
Rushall Olympic F.C. players
Isthmian League players
USL Championship players
Wilmington Hammerheads FC
Real Monarchs coaches
Association football midfielders
English expatriate sportspeople in the United States
English expatriate footballers
English football managers